"Put Your Head on My Shoulder" is a song written and recorded by Paul Anka in 1959 with a popular cover version by The Lettermen in 1968.

It may also refer to:

Put Your Head on My Shoulder (album), a 1966 swing album by Si Zentner & his orchestra
 Put Your Head on My Shoulder (TV series), Chinese drama based on novel by Zhao Qianqian of the same name

See also 
 "Put Your Head on My Shoulders", episode seven in the second production season of Futurama
 "Don't Talk (Put Your Head on My Shoulder)", a song written by Brian Wilson and Tony Asher for the American rock band The Beach Boys from the album Pet Sounds